The 1945 Massachusetts State Aggies football team represented Massachusetts State College in the 1945 college football season. The team was coached by Thomas Eck and played its home games at Alumni Field in Amherst, Massachusetts. The 1945 season was the team's first since disbanding during World War II. Mass State finished the season with a record of 2–1–1.

Schedule

References

Massachusetts State
UMass Minutemen football seasons
Massachusetts State Aggies football